Gloria Karamañites born Panama City, (Panamá), is a Panamanian beauty pageant contestant winner of the Miss Panamá 1980 title. Also represented Panama in Miss Universe 1980, the 29th Miss Universe pageant was held at  Sejong Cultural Center, Seoul, South Korea on July 8, 1980. She placed among the 12 semifinalists. Gloria is the first Black Panamanian to have won the Miss Panamá competition.

She represented Panama Centro state.

References

External links
 Miss Panamá  official website

1960 births
Living people
Miss Universe 1980 contestants
Panamanian beauty pageant winners
People from Panama City
Señorita Panamá